Rola Youssef Saad (born 25 August 1978) is a Lebanese pop singer and model who emerged in the mid-2000s and is most commonly known for her collaboration with Lebanese singer Sabah.

Biography 

Rola Saad was born in Beirut, Lebanon, to a Christian Maronite family (originally from Tannourine)
and became an orphan as a child.

She entered show business first as a model, appearing in fashion ads, most notably for "Habibi" and "Dallou'a" perfumes, as well as landing roles in 2 music videos by Saber Rebaï ("Etzakkarak" and "Hayyarouni"). Her musical beginnings were with Alam al Phan record label. She also opened a fashion company "R with Love" with her elder sister. Her biggest hit was a cover of the Sabah classic "Yana Yana", with Sabah making a cameo in the video. The song became a success in 2006, topping sales charts. She was in the movie Room 707, and in 2011 she participated in a series Sayeen Dayeen.

Rola Saad is now married and living in Beirut.

Discography

Albums 
2004: Aala Da Elhal  
2007: Kol El Gharam  
2009: Al Fostane Al Abyad
2012: Sings Sabah

Singles 
 Doq El Khishab
 Amout W Shouf
 Bi Edak Ana
 Hobla
 Habibi
 Eih Dah Eih Dah
 Meen Elly Shaghil Balak
 Ya Majnouna
 Doq El Khishab
 Excuse Me
 Keteer Bejin Aleik

References 

1978 births
Living people
21st-century Lebanese women singers
Lebanese Maronites
Rotana Records artists
People from Tannourine
Singers who perform in Egyptian Arabic